Empire Comet was a  cargo ship that was built in 1940 by Lithgows Ltd, Port Glasgow for the Ministry of War Transport (MoWT).

Description
Empire Comet was built by Lithgows Ltd, Port Glasgow as yard number 941. She was launched on 21 November 1940, and completed in January 1941.

She had a GRT of 6,914 and a NRT of 4,162.Empire Comet was propelled by a 4-stroke Single Cycle Single Acting diesel engine, which had eight cylinders of  diameter by 59 (151 cm) stroke. The engine was built by J G Kincaid & Co Ltd, Greenock.

History
Empire Comet was built for the MoWT. She was placed under the management of Dodd, Thompson & Co Ltd. Her port of registry was Greenock. She was allocated the United Kingdom Official Number 166990 and Code Letters GPFU were allocated.

Empire Comet was a member of a number of convoys during the Second World War.

HX 118
Convoy HX 118 departed Halifax, Nova Scotia on 31 March 1941 and arrived at Liverpool on 18 April. Empire Comet was carrying a cargo of wheat.

HX 174
Convoy HX 174 departed Halifax on 7 February 1942 bound for Liverpool. Empire Comet was carrying a cargo of linseed, manganese ore, peanuts and tea. She had departed from Bombay, India on 12 November 1940 and sailed via Table Bay, South Africa and Halifax. She was bound for Manchester. Empire Comet straggled behind the convoy. At 22:17 (German time) on 17 February 1942, Empire Comet was hit by two torpedoes fired by the German submarine  under the command of Heinrich Zimmerman. All 38 crew and eight DEMS gunners were lost. The crew are commemorated on panel 39 of the Tower Hill Memorial, London.

References

1940 ships
Ships built on the River Clyde
Ministry of War Transport ships
Empire ships
Steamships of the United Kingdom
Merchant ships of the United Kingdom
Ships sunk by German submarines in World War II
World War II shipwrecks in the Atlantic Ocean
Ships lost with all hands
Maritime incidents in February 1942